Lake Mirror is a lake in Lakeland, Florida.

Lake Mirror was so named on account of the clarity of its waters.

The city of Lakeland operates the Lake Mirror Complex, a recreation center at the lake.

References

Landforms of Polk County, Florida
Mirror